The Valley of Doubt is a 1920 American silent northern drama film directed by Burton George and starring Arline Pretty, Thurston Hall and Anna Lehr.

Cast
 Arline Pretty as 	Marion
 Thurston Hall as	Jules
 Anna Lehr as 	Annice
 William B. Davidson as 	Macy
 Robert Agnew as 	Tommy
 Jack Castello as 	Jacques
 T.J. Murray as 	Hilgrade
 John Ardizoni as 	Durant

References

Bibliography
 Connelly, Robert B. The Silents: Silent Feature Films, 1910-36, Volume 40, Issue 2. December Press, 1998.
 Munden, Kenneth White. The American Film Institute Catalog of Motion Pictures Produced in the United States, Part 1. University of California Press, 1997.

External links
 

1920 films
1920 drama films
1920s English-language films
American silent feature films
Silent American drama films
American black-and-white films
Films directed by Burton George
Selznick Pictures films
Films set in Canada
1920s American films